Gethyllidinae is a small subtribe within the amaryllis family. It is within tribe Haemantheae, and therefore within the African clades of Amaryllidoideae. It contains two genera, Gethyllis and Apodolirion, both are endemic to southern Africa.

Description 

Gethyllis and Apodolirion are two unifloral genera with fused spathe bracts that retain the ovary inside the bulbs until the fruit matures. In both the scape remains inside the bulbs. The fruit is large, fleshy, and aromatic with many seeds, and distinct from the rest of Haemantheae which have berry fruits with only a few seeds. These seeds are also small and hard, while the rest of Haemantheae have seeds that are larger, fleshy and water rich.

The genera are also distinguished from each other by their stigmata. In Gethyllis this is capitate, while in Apodolirion it is trifid. Also, Apodolirion has six stamina while Gethyllis has many more, with some species having 18 or more.

Taxonomy 
For the early taxonomic history of these two genera, see Meerow and Clayton (2004). Gethyllis was one of the two Hamantheae genera to be described (Linnaeus 1753), and in 1829 Dumortier placed it in a monotypic higher taxon, tribe Gethyllideae, and hence is given as the authority, a practice followed by Salisbury. Baker described Apodolirion in 1878, noting the close resemblance to Gethyllis. Pax (1888) then placed both genera in his subtribe Zephyranthinae, as one of six genera, a practice followed by Hutchinson (1926), though at tribal rank.

Traub recognised the distinct features of these two genera, for which he created the tribe Gethylleae in his 1963 monograph on the Amaryllidaceae, based on the type genus Gethyllis. He (amongst others) even expressed the idea that they might be a single genus. On the other hand, Dahlgren (1985) submerged them once again in Haemantheae. Subsequently, the Müller-Doblies' restored Gethyllidinae as a tribe. Later molecular phylogenetic research has shown that these two genera, while forming a monophyletic subclade, is situated as one of three subtribes of Haemantheae, since forming a separate tribe renders Haemantheae paraphyletic. Although the two genera are resolved in this process as distinct sister groups, the possibility that they may eventually be considered a single genus remains.

Phylogeny 
The Gethyllidinae are placed within the Haemantheae as follows:

Genera 
 Apodolirion  (~6 species)
 Gethyllis (~35 species)

Distribution and habitat 
Gethyllis is found in winter rainfall regions of southern Africa, while Apodolirion is found in the summer rainfall zone.

References

Bibliography 

  Volume 2: Dicotyledonae 1934.

External links 
 

Amaryllidoideae
Flora of Southern Africa
Plant subtribes